Centro Desportivo de Fátima, simply known as Fátima, is a Portuguese football club based in Fátima, in the municipality of Ourém. Founded in 1966, it holds home matches at Estádio Papa Francisco, with a capacity of 1,545 spectators.

Club's home kit is dark-red for shirt, shorts and socks, with the away one being all white.

History

Founded on 24 January 1966, Fátima first reached the Liga de Honra in 2007, but only stayed one season there. During the season's Taça da Liga, it managed to oust FC Porto on penalties, before bowing out to another first divisioner, Sporting CP (4–4 on aggregate, and with a 2–1 away triumph).

In 2009, manager Rui Vitória led the side once again to the second level.

Current squad

League and Cups history

Honours
Segunda Divisão: 2008–09
Terceira Divisão: 1990–91, 1997–98, 1999–2000
Regional League (2nd division): 1969–70

References

External links
Official website 
Footballzz team profile

 
Association football clubs established in 1966
Football clubs in Portugal
1966 establishments in Portugal
Liga Portugal 2 clubs